Der royter shtern ("The red star") may refer to:
 Der royter shtern (Buenos Aires), a newspaper published between 1923 and 1934
 Der royter shtern (Vitebsk), a newspaper published between 1920 and 1923

See also 
 Red star (disambiguation)